Hopton Tunnel is a former railway tunnel in Hopton, Derbyshire. Located on the former Cromford and High Peak Railway. The tunnel was closed along with the line in 1967 and is now in use for the High Peak Trail.

References 

Railway tunnels in England
Derbyshire